Cat City may refer to:

 Cat City, a 1986 Hungarian animated film
 Cathedral City, California, a city in Southern California, United States colloquially known as Cat City

See also

 Cathedral city (disambiguation)